The 2020–21 Appalachian State Mountaineers men's basketball team represented Appalachian State University in the 2020–21 NCAA Division I men's basketball season. The Mountaineers, led by second-year head coach Dustin Kerns, played their home games at the George M. Holmes Convocation Center in Boone, North Carolina as members of the Sun Belt Conference. With the creation of divisions to cut down on travel due to the COVID-19 pandemic, they played in the East Division. They finished the season 17–12, 7–8 in Sun Belt Play to finish 4th in the East Division. They defeated Little Rock, Texas State, Coastal Carolina, and Georgia State to win the Sun Belt tournament. They received the conference's automatic bid to the NCAA tournament where they lost in the First Four to Norfolk State.

Previous season
The Mountaineers finished the 2019–20 season 18–15, 11–9 in Sun Belt play to finish in sixth place. They defeated Coastal Carolina in the second round of the Sun Belt tournament before losing in the quarterfinals to Texas State.

Roster

Schedule and results

|-
!colspan=12 style=| Non-conference Regular season

|-
!colspan=12 style=| Conference Regular season

|-
!colspan=12 style=| Sun Belt tournament
|-

|-
!colspan=12 style=| NCAA tournament
|-

|-

Source

References

Appalachian State Mountaineers men's basketball seasons
Appalachian State Mountaineers
Appalachian State Mountaineers men's basketball
Appalachian State Mountaineers men's basketball
Appalachian State